849 Naval Air Squadron was a squadron of the Fleet Air Arm, the Air Arm of the British Royal Navy.  It was formed during the Second World War as a carrier based torpedo-bomber, unit, flying missions against Japanese targets in the Far East.  Its service since the Second World War has been as an airborne early warning squadron, flying fixed winged Skyraiders and Gannets from the Royal Navy's fixed wing carriers from 1952 until 1978, and airborne early warning Sea King helicopters from 1982 to 2018.

Operational history

World War two
849 Naval Air Squadron was formed on 1 August 1943 at the Naval Air Station Quonset Point, Rhode Island with Grumman Avenger Is. It returned to the UK and provided anti-surface vessel and anti-submarine patrols over the English Channel prior to and during the D-Day operations.

It took part in Operation Lentil against oil installations at Pangkalan Brandan in Sumatra on 4 January 1945, and in the larger carrier strikes against the oil refineries at Palembang Sumatra (Operation Meridian) on 24 and 29 January.

Victorious, including 849 in its Carrier Air Group, took part in operations in support of the American invasion of Okinawa from March to May 1945, flying strikes against airfields used by Japanese Kamikaze aircraft on the Sakishima Islands and on Formosa.  Still aboard Victorious, No. 849  took place in raids against the Japanese Home islands in July and August, including the bombing raids on 24 July that resulted in severe damage to the Japanese escort carrier Kaiyo. It disbanded on 31 October 1945.

Airborne Early Warning (1953-78)

The squadron reformed at Royal Naval Air Station (RNAS) Culdrose on 7 July 1953, being equipped with ex United States Navy Douglas Skyraider AD4W as an Airborne Early Warning unit, from 778 Naval Air Squadron. These were operated by squadron detachments assigned to the Royal Navy's aircraft carriers HMS Ark Royal, Bulwark, Albion, Centaur, Eagle, Hermes and Victorious.

Following the retirement of the Skyraiders in December 1960, the unit flew the Fairey Gannet AEW.3 in the same role, operating from HMS Eagle, Ark Royal, Centaur, Hermes and Victorious. Gannet AS.4, COD.4 and T.5s were also operated in supporting roles. The squadron detachments continued as 849B (Ark Royal) and 849HQ (RAF Lossiemouth), until the squadron disbanded again on 15 December 1978.

In November 1970 Bristol Belle, one of the first hot air balloons to fly in UK, was piloted by Lt Terry Adams, accompanied by Lt Howard Draper both of 849 Squadron B Flight (Gannets). This early morning launch carried mail into Malta whilst the Ark Royal was steaming off the southern coast of that island.

Helicopter AEW (1984 to 2018)

It reformed after the lessons of the 1982 South Atlantic campaign had been learned, on 8 November 1984 and the unit then operated the Westland Sea King Mk7 Airborne Surveillance and Control (ASaC) helicopter. The squadron was stationed at RNAS Culdrose in Cornwall, operating 9 aircraft. It was divided into three elements - two flights (A and B), or Aardvarks and Bees and the Operational Conversion Unit (OCU)(Previously known as HQ). Historically, a Flight was assigned to each of the two active aircraft carriers in the Royal Navy. The squadron suffered heavy losses during the 2003 invasion of Iraq when two of its aircraft operating from HMS Ark Royal collided during low visibility conditions. Six squadron members and an American exchange officer were killed in the collision.

On 13 December 2006, after a short ceremony at RNAS Culdrose, A Flight became 854 Squadron and B Flight became 857 Squadron, taking the former's Sea King ASaC.7 with them.

In May 2014, the MOD announced that seven ASaC.7 helicopters, to be operated by 849 Naval Air Squadron, would remain in service with the RN through to the second half of 2018; the remainder of the Royal Navy's Sea Kings, of all types, were to be withdrawn by 2016.

854 and 857 Naval Air Squadrons were reabsorbed by 849 Naval Air Squadron in 2015, to form 'Normandy' and 'Palembang' flights respectively.  The third flight in 849 NAS is 'Okinawa Flight'.

Decommissioning 

849NAS briefly operated a single Augusta Westland Merlin HM Mk2 from February 2020 in anticipation of the Mk2 receiving the Crowsnest upgraded ASaC system. 849 NAS decommissioned on 21 April 2020.

Aircraft operated
The squadron operated a variety of different aircraft and versions:
 Grumman Avenger I & II
 Douglas Skyraider AEW.1
 Fairey Gannet AEW.3, AS.4, COD.4 & T.5
 Westland Sea King AEW.2/2A
   Westland Sea King ASaC Mk7
   Augusta Westland Merlin HM Mk2

References

Citations

Bibliography

"Naval Early Warners:No. 849 A Unique Fleet Air Arm Squadron". Flight, 22 October 1954, pp. 604–605.
Brown, David. Carrier Air Groups: HMS Eagle: Volume 1. Windsor, UK: Hylton Lacy, 1972. .

External links

849
Air squadrons of the Royal Navy in World War II
Military units and formations established in 1943
Military of the United Kingdom in Cornwall